Clastopus may refer to:
 Clastopus (beetle), a genus of beetles in the family Tenebrionidae
 Clastopus (plant), a genus of flowering plants in the family Brassicaceae